The Fix is an American legal drama series that premiered on March 18, 2019 on ABC. On May 15, 2018, it was scheduled for midseason 2018–19 television season. On May 10, 2019, ABC canceled the series after a single season.

Cast

Main
 Robin Tunney as Maya Travis, a former Los Angeles assistant district attorney (DA) whose career was ruined by her failure to successfully prosecute a famous actor for murder, only to find herself investigating him eight years later for another murder.
 Adewale Akinnuoye-Agbaje as Sevvy Johnson, an A-list actor acquitted of killing his girlfriend and another woman, but at the cost of his fame and reputation. He now finds himself under suspicion for the death of his new girlfriend, Jessica Meyer.
 Adam Rayner as Matthew Collier, an assistant DA and Maya's old colleague who appoints her to lead the investigation into Meyer's death.
 Merrin Dungey as (Carisa) C.J. Emerson, a senior investigator for the DA's office.
 Breckin Meyer as Alan "Charlie" Wiest, the Los Angeles district attorney who generally delegates most of his responsibilities to his subordinates, and who seems more interested in protecting his job than in prosecuting Johnson.
 Marc Blucas as River "Riv" Allgood, Maya's boyfriend and the owner of a horse farm.
 Mouzam Makkar as Loni Kampour, Maya's successor as assistant DA who maintains a corrupt association with defense lawyer Ezra Wolf.
 Alex Saxon as Gabriel Johnson, Sevvy's stepson.
 Scott Cohen as Ezra Wolf, a celebrity lawyer known as the "Wolfman" for his aggressive style who was responsible for getting Johnson cleared of murder charges. He once again comes to his old client's defense after he is accused of a new murder, but with ulterior motives.

Recurring
 Taylor Kalupa as Jessica Meyer, Johnson's girlfriend whose death triggers a new police investigation into his life.
 Robin Givens as Julianne Johnson, Johnson's ex-wife who extorts money from her former husband to defend him in the media.
 Robbie Jones as Detective Vincent North, an investigating officer in the Meyer case.
 Vannessa Vasquez as Dia Briseño, a mistress of Johnson's who becomes an informant for the police.
 KJ Smith as Charlie
 Chasten Harmon as Star Johnson, Sevvy's oldest daughter.
 Robert Wisdom as Buck Neal, a professional fixer employed by Wolf.
 Daniella Alonso as Effy, Matthew's wife.
 Erik Palladino as Leo Foster, a security guard at the DA's office.
 Molly C. Quinn as Lindsay Meyer, Jessica's sister.
 Skye P. Marshall as Angela Ashley
 Abraham Lim as Ares Ahn, Wolf's associate.
 Mitchell Edwards as Sevvy Johnson Jr, Sevvy's son.
 Cranston Johnson as James Meloy
 Lynn Collins as Dr. Carys Daly
 Bianca Lopez as Flight Attendant Marie
 Alyssa Owens as Sunny Johnson, Sevvy's youngest daughter.
Lissa Pallo as Elaine Paxon.

Episodes

Release

Marketing
On May 15, 2018, ABC released the first official trailer for the series.

Reception

Critical response
On review aggregator Rotten Tomatoes, the series holds an approval rating of 60% based on 15 reviews, with an average rating of 5.68/10. The website's critical consensus reads, "Powerful performances by Robin Tunney and Adewale Akinnuoye-Agbaje will give viewers their drama Fix, but the series' concept will strike many viewers as a self-serving rewrite of recent history." On Metacritic, it has a weighted average score of 52 out of 100, based on 10 critics, indicating "mixed or average reviews".

Ratings

References

External links

2010s American drama television series
2010s American legal television series
2019 American television series debuts
2019 American television series endings
American legal drama television series
American Broadcasting Company original programming
English-language television shows
Television series by ABC Studios
Television shows set in Los Angeles
Television series about prosecutors